Feinman(n) is a surname. Notable people with the surname include:

 Barbara Feinman, ghostwriter of It Takes a Village
 Dinah Shtettin (1862–1946), later Feinman, Yiddish theater actress
 Paul Feinman (1960–2021), American attorney
 Richard D. Feinman (born 1940), American biochemist
 Eduardo Feinmann (born 1958), Argentine journalist
 José Pablo Feinmann (born 1943), Argentine philosopher and screenwriter

See also 
 Fein (disambiguation)
 Feynman
 Fineman

Jewish surnames
Yiddish-language surnames